Robert Dellar (16 December 1964 – 17 December 2016) was an activist, musician and poet who founded Mad Pride with others. He died of a pulmonary embolism one day after his fifty-second birthday, with a post mortem revealing he also had pancreatic cancer. He wrote several books, and a biography was published posthumously.

Dellar was appointed as a development worker at Southwark Mind in 1997.

Publications
 Splitting in Two: Mad Pride and Punk Rock Oblivion Unkant Publishers (2014) 
 Seaton Point Robert Dellar and others, Spare Change Books (1998) 
 Mad Pride: A Celebration of Mad Culture by Robert Dellar with Ted Curtis and Esther Leslie (2003)

References

External links
 The Wake of Robert Dellar 24th January 2017
 Robert Dellar Inaugural lecture
 A Fierce Intellect And Pioneer Activist Morning Star obituary by Ruth Hunt

1964 births
2016 deaths
Psychiatric survivor activists
Deaths from pulmonary embolism
Nationality missing